David Macleod Sutherland (24 June 1875 – 13 December 1951) was a British journalist and editor.

Biography 

Born in Edinburgh, he attended George Watson's College and University of Edinburgh. He was the London editor of the Manchester Daily Dispatch before assuming the editorship of the Sheffield Daily Telegraph. He was named editor of Evening Standard in 1914 and served in that capacity for a year, leaving to take over as editor of the Pall Mall Gazette. Sutherland was the last editor of the Pall Mall Gazette, serving in that position until the newspaper was incorporated into the Evening Standard in 1923. He then left journalism to become the Secretary and Director of Propaganda for the Anti-Socialist and Anti-Communist Union.

References

People educated at George Watson's College
British male journalists
British newspaper editors
1875 births
1951 deaths
London Evening Standard people
Alumni of the University of Edinburgh